Total revenue of oil and gas companies is listed in billions of U.S. dollars. Total revenue is usually self-reported by the company, and often reported by neutral, unbiased, reliable publications. Reported data may be subsequently revised or restated due to a wide range of issues such as exchange rates, contract settlements, or mid-year discontinuation of products or services. Fiscal years are for January 1 to December 31, except where noted. Empty cells indicate that no data for that year has been reported yet.

This list is partially sourced from the S&P Global Commodity Insights Top 250 Global Energy Company Rankings for 2022. The S&P Global list is restricted to publicly traded companies, and only integrated oil and gas, oil and gas exploration and production, oil and gas refining and marketing, and oil and gas storage and transportation companies were included on the list below. For state-owned oil corporations, the list below is also partially sourced from data provided by Statista and the Sovereign Wealth Fund Institute.

This list provides data for parent companies, not each subsidiary.

Table

See also
 List of largest manufacturing companies by revenue
 List of largest financial services companies by revenue
 List of largest companies by revenue
 List of public corporations by market capitalization
 List of largest corporate profits and losses
 List of public corporations by market capitalization
 Fortune Global 500
 Forbes Global 2000

References
Notes

Citations

External links
Annual ranking of the world's 100 largest oil companies 2021 by Petroleum Intelligence Weekly
The Biggest Oil and Gas Companies in the World in 2020 by Statista
World's Biggest Oil Companies in 2015 by Forbes
Largest oil and gas companies by market capitalization

Oil And Gas Companies By Revenue
Oil And Gas Companies By Revenue